Pisco  is a grape brandy produced in Peru and Chile.

Pisco or PISCO may also refer to:

Places

Peru
 Pisco, Peru, a coastal city
 Pisco Province, Ica Region
 Pisco District, Pisco Province
 Pisco (mountain), in the Cordillera Blanca
 Pisco River, Pisco Province, flowing to the Pacific Ocean
 Pisco Valley, Pisco Province

Portugal
 Pisco (Portuguese mountain range), Guarda District

Spain
 Pisco (mountain)
 Pisco (Spanish mountain range), Galicia

Geology
Pisco Basin, a sedimentary basin in southwestern Peru
Pisco Formation, a Neogene-aged sedimentary formation in Pisco Basin

PISCO
 Partnership for Interdisciplinary Studies of Coastal Oceans, a research organization that specializes in the dynamics of the coastal ocean ecosystems
 Peace International School, Ghana

Other uses
 BAP Pisco (AMP-156), a Peruvian Navy landing platform dock

See also